W is an American fashion magazine that features stories about style through the lens of culture, fashion, art, celebrity, and film.

W was created in 1972 by James Brady, the publisher of the sister magazine Women's Wear Daily (WWD), originally as a biweekly newspaper spin-off from WWD. In 1993, W was launched as an oversized fashion magazine, issued monthly. In 2000, Conde Nast purchased W from the original owner, Fairchild Publications. The magazine was still presented in an oversized format – 10 inches wide and 13 inches tall. Sara Moonves was editor-in-chief when the final print issue was published in March 2020. W was relaunched as an online fashion magazine.

W had a reader base of nearly half a million, 469,000 of which are annual subscribers.

Publication history

Early years, 1972–1999
Its origins stem from a biweekly newspaper that was spun off from Women's Wear Daily, W became an oversized monthly magazine published by Fairchild Fashion Media in 1993. When Fairchilds' owner – Capital Cities/ABC – merged with The Walt Disney Company in 1997, W was one of the publications the new company continued with.

Condé Nast, 1999–2019
In 1999, Condé Nast bought W from the Walt Disney Company, as the centerpiece of a $650 million deal that also included WWD, Jane and a number of other retail trade titles. 

Often the subject of controversy, W subsequently featured stories and covers which have provoked mixed responses from its intended audience; most of Ws most memorable covers are featured on the W Classics page on the magazine's website. In July 2005, W produced a 60-page Steven Klein portfolio of Angelina Jolie and Brad Pitt entitled "Domestic Bliss". The shoot was based upon Pitt's idea of the irony of the perfect American family; set in 1963, the photographs mirror the era when 1960s disillusionment was boiling under the facade of pristine 1950s suburbia.

Other controversial cover shoots include Steven Meisel's entitled "Asexual Revolution", in which male and female models (including Jessica Stam and Karen Elson) are depicted in gender-bending styles and provocative poses. In addition, Tom Ford's racy shoot with Klein and the accompanying article on sexuality in fashion came as a shock to some loyal readers. During the interview, Ford is quoted as saying: "I've always been about pansexuality. Whether I'm sleeping with girls or not at this point in my life, the clothes have often been androgynous, which is very much my standard of beauty". Klein was also the photographer for the racy photo shoot featured in the August 2007 issue, showcasing David and Victoria Beckham. Bruce Weber produced a 60-page tribute to New Orleans in the April 2008 issue, and shot a 36-page story on the newest fashion designers in Miami for the July 2008 issue. 

W also became well known for covering high class Western and Asian societies. Many of these society luminaries, as well as the elite of the entertainment and fashion industries, have allowed W into their homes for the magazine's "W House Tours" feature, including Marc Jacobs, Sir Evelyn Rothschild and Imelda Marcos. 

By 2009, W was harder hit than most fashion publications by a drop in luxury advertising, with ad pages down nearly 46 percent in one year. Longtime editor in chief Patrick McCarthy retired in 2010 when Condé Nast moved W to its consumer magazine group, along with Vogue, Glamour and Allure. Stefano Tonchi succeeded him as the magazine's editor in chief. In 2011, Edward Enninful was tapped to take the magazine's style directorship. Under Enninful's direction, W generated considerable attention for its riskier editorial, including the March 2012 cover shot by Steven Klein featuring Kate Moss depicted as a nun as well as another cover featuring singer Nicki Minaj dolled up as an 18th-century French courtesan. For the magazine's November 2011 art issue, Enninful collaborated with Steven Meisel on a series of fake advertisements that ran throughout the magazine, including one that featured RuPaul's Drag Race Season 3 contestant Carmen Carrera hawking a fictitious fragrance called La Femme. 

In 2011, W participated in a four-episode plot line on the fourth season of CW teen drama Gossip Girl. 

Over the years, the magazine cut back its print editions from monthly in 2013 to eight times in 2018.

Future Media, 2019–2020
In 2018, W became one of three publications Condé Nast put up for sale in the face of significant financial losses that forced it to adopt a series of cost-cutting measures. By 2019, it was acquired by Future Media, in a deal the New York Post estimated at $7 million. In June 2019, Moonves was named as its first-ever female editor-in-chief, succeeding Stefano Tonchi.

Under Moonves's editorship, the magazine underwent a major transition. By 2020, she announced to staff that many were being furloughed and that those who work on online content would be staying on at reduced salaries. The new W team finished the biggest Best Performances issue ever. In the first week of January 2020, W launched nine covers, a 76-page celebrity portfolio covering 29 celebrities and 20 videos. Additionally, the magazine launched a series of new initiatives and dramatically expanded its digital footprint. They launched W’s first podcast, 5 Things with Lynn Hirschberg, which attracted a broad listener base and included guests like Quentin Tarantino, Charlize Theron, Saoirse Ronan, Greta Gerwig, Noah Baumbach, Nicole Kidman, Awkwafina, and Margot Robbie as a part of the new vision for the brand.

W Media, 2020–present
On August 14, 2020, W was acquired by Bustle Digital Group, Mic, and W Media, a newly formed joint venture led by Karlie Kloss and including Aryeh Bourkoff, Jason Blum, Kaia Gerber, Kirsten Green and Lewis Hamilton. They retained Moonves as editor-in-chief.

International editions
An international edition was previously published in Japan. The South Korean edition was launched in 2005 and is published under license by Doosan Magazine.

See also
List of W cover models
List of W Korea cover models

References

External links
 Official website

Condé Nast magazines
Defunct women's magazines published in the United States
Fashion magazines published in the United States
Magazines disestablished in 2020
Magazines established in 1971
Magazines published in New York City
Monthly magazines published in the United States
Online magazines published in the United States
Online magazines with defunct print editions
Women's fashion magazines